Martin Luther Keane (born July 12, 1969) is a Jamaican-born Canadian former professional basketball forward/center. Keane played in three consecutive FIBA World Championships for the Canada men's national basketball team, played for many professional teams, and is active in coaching.

Personal
Born in Kingston, Keane is the son of Patricia Francis-Keane and Leroy Keane. Keane's father  was a member of the Jamaican National Track Team as well as an All-American at the University of Nebraska. Martin Keane attended Northeast Junior College in Nebraska, where he was voted a First Team All-American.  He then attended the University of Oklahoma and then graduated from the University of Washington.

International career 
Keane played with the Canadian National Team from 1989–2001. Keane was featured in the 1990 FIBA World Championship in (Argentina).  He participated in the 1991 Pan American Games in Havana, Cuba.  Also in 1991, Keane was a Silver Medalist in the World Student Games in the United Kingdom, losing to Team USA in the finals.

Keane played in the 1994 FIBA World Championship in (Toronto), the Canadian team finishing 7th. Keane participated in the 1998 FIBA World Championship in (Greece). 

Keane played for Canada in the 2001 Goodwill Games in Brisbane, Australia.

Club career
Keane first played professional basketball from 1994 to 1995 in Tenerife in the Canary Islands. In 1996 Keane was invited to try out for the (NBA) Toronto Raptors by Isaiah Thomas, but was not signed to the team.  

Keane then played for Pamesa Valencia ACB in Spain from 1996 to 1997, 1997 to 1998 for Melilla Baloncesto.  He returned to the United States that same year to play one season for the Continental Basketball Association (CBA) Quad City Thunder.

In 1999–2000 Keane played for Hitachi Honsha Rising Sun in the Japan Basketball League and in 2001 for the Basketball Bundesliga in Germany.  In 2002 he played for Bahrain in The Asian Championship (Dubai). Keane returned to Spain (LEB) with Ferrol 2002–03 Ranked #1 all year, (LEB) Burgos 2003–04 finalists and (LEB) Castellón 2004. In 2004 Keane returned to Canada to play for the Barrie Bandits of the Ontario Professional Basketball League. 

After playing in Uruguay in 2005 with the Salto Basketball Club, Keane retired from playing professional basketball.

Managerial career 
Since 2005, Keane has been coaching in South America, the United States and China. Keane was voted Coach of the Year in 2012 and 2013 at two different basketball academies in Beijing. 

Also in 2013, Keane briefly returned to playing basketball for a Red Bull basketball tournament in China. At age 44, Keane averaged 14 points, 14 rebounds and 5 assists during the tournament and his team went to the final rounds.

Community service
Keane is an Honorary Advisor to basketball boards in Canada, China, and Spain. He has served as a foster parent with the Canadian Children's Aid Society for ten boys. 

On August 12, 2015, Keane was named Honorary CEO of Matik Media Enterprises Magazine.

Sources
USBASKET
basket stats
sportsillustrated.cnn.com
query.nytimes.com
http://www.chebucto.ns.ca
laurierathletics.com
goodwillgames.com

1969 births
Living people
Sportspeople from Kingston, Jamaica
AB Castelló players
Basketball players at the 1991 Pan American Games
Black Canadian basketball players
Canadian expatriate basketball people in Germany
Canadian expatriate basketball people in Japan
Canadian expatriate basketball people in Spain
Canadian expatriate basketball people in the United States
Canadian expatriate sportspeople in Uruguay
Canadian men's basketball players
1990 FIBA World Championship players
Giessen 46ers players
Jamaican emigrants to Canada
Melilla Baloncesto players
Oklahoma Sooners men's basketball players
Pan American Games competitors for Canada
Quad City Thunder players
Basketball players from Toronto
Valencia Basket players
Washington Huskies men's basketball players
1998 FIBA World Championship players
Competitors at the 2001 Goodwill Games
1994 FIBA World Championship players